Hippoclus, tyrant of Lampsacus, to whose son, Aeantides, Hippias gave his daughter Archedice in marriage, induced thereto, says Thucydides, by consideration of his influence at the Persian court.

He is clearly the same who is named as tyrant of Lampsacus in the list of those who were left at the passage of the Danube during the Scythian expedition of Darius I.

Notes

Archaic tyrants
5th-century BC Greek people
Ancient Greeks from the Achaemenid Empire
Rulers in the Achaemenid Empire
Military personnel of the Achaemenid Empire